The 2020 Zambian Charity Shield (also known as The Atlas Mara Samuel ‘Zoom’ Ndhlovu Charity Shield  for sponsorship reasons) was the 55th Charity Shield, an annual football match played between the winners of the Super League, Nkana and the winners of the ABSA Cup. However, due to the Covid-19 pandemic, the 2019–20 ABSA cup did not take place, FAZ  had to pick the winners of the second-tier league champions Indeni. This was Nkana's 17th Charity Shield final and the second appearance for Indeni since 2000. The game was played behind closed doors on 24 October 2020 at  Arthur Davies Stadium in Kitwe, but the match was televised live on SuperSport. 

Zanaco were the defending champions as winners of the 2019–20 Zambian Charity Shield but, did not qualify for this edition, as they failed to win the Super League. 

Nkana won 2–0 with both goals scored by Idris Mbombo who was named man of the match for his performance.

Background 
The 2020-21 Charity Shield only featured the Super League champions, Nkana and the National Division One League champions, Indeni since the 2019–20 ABSA cup did not take place due to Covid-19.

Match

Summary 
The match started on a cagey note, with Indeni looking more enterprising but the first chance would fall to Nkana when Ramadhan Singano saw his effort come off the woodwork in the 17th minute. Four minutes later, Nkana broke the deadlock, with Idris Mbombo tapping home from close range from an assist by Patrick Gondwe after Indeni failed to clear a cross by Liaison Thole. Mbombo was again on hand to net his second of the match with an acrobatic effort from a rebound after goalkeeper Charles Lawu failed to deal with a Gondwe shot.

Details

References 

Zambian Charity Shield
Charity Shield
Charity Shield